Arros-de-Nay is a commune in the Pyrénées-Atlantiques department in the Nouvelle-Aquitaine region of south-western France.

The inhabitants of the commune are known as Arrosiens or Arrosiennes

Geography
Arros-de-Nay is part of the urban area of Pau located in the heart of a valley between wooded hills and the Gave de Pau some 13 km south-east of Pau immediately east of Nay. The commune has been administered by the department of Pyrénées-Atlantiques since 1969 (formerly it had been in the Department of Basses-Pyrénées since 1793). The commune has about 300 houses. The altitude varies from 230 metres to 421 metres, with 243 metres in the village centre. This is one of the largest communal areas of the region with areas of plains and hilly areas with a livable areas in the north and in the hamlets.

Access to the commune is by road D37 from Saint-Abit in the north passing through the village and the northern corner of the commune continuing to Bourdettes in the south. The D936 goes west from the village then south-west to Rébénacq. The D288 road goes south from the village through the length of the commune to join the D287 north of Lys. The D388 branches from the D288 and goes south-west by a different route to join the D288 again south-west of the commune. The D287 goes south-west from Nay passing along the south-eastern border of the commune  and continuing south-west to Sévignacq-Meyracq.

The commune is located in the Drainage basin of the Adour with the Luz flowing from the south through the length of the commune collecting many tributaries and continuing north to join the Gave de Pau near Narcastet. The Escourre flows north through the northern corner of the commune and the north-eastern tip of the commune touches the Gave de Pau.

Places and Hamlets

 Allemand (hill)
 Bacabara
 Barbé
 Barrère
 Barthe
 Bées
 Bégué
 La Bernadie
 Bois de Bié (forest)
 Blanquet
 Blon
 Bouhabent
 Bourda-Plà
 Bouria
 Bozom
 Brouquet
 Brousset
 Cabarry
 Casamayou
 Casenave
 Castéra
 Cataline
 La Châtaigneraie (two places)
 Grange Clédou
 Couchies
 Coumet
 Daguès-Bié
 Gahuset
 Guillamasse
 Habarna
 Habe
 Haure
 Hourcade
 Jupé
 Labasserres
 Labourie
 Lacrouts
 Ladebat
 Lambrou
 Lanot
 Lasbordes
 Bois de Lauga (forest)
 Lème Carraze
 Lème Monlucou
 Lolou
 Grange Lolou
 Lombré
 Massaly (ruins)
 Michelat
 Grange Miramon
 Moncaut (spring)
 Mondaut
 Grange Monsempès
 Moun du Rey
 Mourtérou
 Nérios
 Ourthe
 L'Oustau
 Paloc
 Petit Paloc
 Pareil
 Pédemelou
 Le Petit Hameau
 Picourlat
 Plà
 Le Point de Vue
 Porteteny
 Rieupeyrous
 Thomas
 Toulet
 Tourne (ruins)

Neighbouring communes and villages

Toponymy
The commune name in béarnais is Arros de Nai.

Michel Grosclaude, with much reservation, suggested an Aquitaine root of (h)arr ("stone" or "rock") with the suffix -ossum, which gives a meaning "where there are rocks".

The following table details the origins of the commune name and other names in the commune.

Sources:
Raymond: Topographic Dictionary of the Department of Basses-Pyrenees, 1863, on the page numbers indicated in the table. 
Grosclaude: Toponymic Dictionary of communes, Béarn, 2006 
Pau: Cartulary of the Château of Pau
Cassini: Cassini Map from 1750

Origins:
Marca: Pierre de Marca, History of Béarn.
Reformation: Reformation of Béarn
Census: Census of Béarn

On 27 January 1932 the prefect, citing consecutive administrative mistakes from the plurality of the name Arros in the department (Arros Canton of Nay, Arros Canton of Oloron), decided to associate the name of the chief town of the canton with that of the commune and asked the Municipal Council to endorse his decision. The council of the time complied and the name became Arros-de-Nay.

History

The first traces of the village date to the 11th century when it was cited with the name Arrossium ("place where there are rocks"). In the 12th century a noble family (de Rode, d'Arrode, then d'Arros) who owned the Lordships of Rode, Vauzé, the Viguerie of Lembeye took possession of the fief which became Arrode then later Arros.

Paul Raymond noted that, in 1385, Arros had 44 fires and depended on the bailiwick of Pau. Arros, with its hamlets towards Bosdarros ('Bois d'Arros'), was the seventh largest of the twelve large Baronies of Béarn.

Heraldry

Administration
List of Successive Mayors

Mayors from 1961

Inter-communality
The commune is part of seven inter-communal structures:
 the Communauté de communes du Pays de Nay;
 the AEP association of Nay-Ouest;
 the Sanitation association of Pays du Nay;
 the Energy association of Pyrénées-Atlantiques;
 the inter-communal association for the defence against floods of the Gave de Pau;
 the inter-communal association for the defence against floods of the Luz;
 the inter-communal association for the construction of the CES of Nay;

Demography
In 2017 the commune had 783 inhabitants.

Economy

The commune is part of the Appellation d'origine contrôlée (AOC) zone designation of Ossau-iraty.

Culture and Heritage

Civil heritage
The Chateau of Arros (17th century) is registered as an historical monument.

Religious heritage

The Parish Church of Saint-Jacques-le-Majeur (1835) is registered as an historical monument.

Education
Arros-de-Nay has a primary school.

See also
Communes of the Pyrénées-Atlantiques department

References

External links
Arros on the 1750 Cassini Map

Communes of Pyrénées-Atlantiques